This was the first edition of the tournament.

Adrián Menéndez-Maceiras and Aleksandr Nedovyesov won the title by defeating Yuki Bhambri and Divij Sharan 2–6, 6–4, [10–3] in the final.

Seeds

Draw

Draw

References
 Main Draw

Indore Open - Doubles
2014 Doubles